There have been two baronetcies created for persons with the surname Hanson, both in the Baronetage of the United Kingdom. One creation is extant as of 2010.

The Hanson Baronetcy, of Bryanston Square in the County of Middlesex, was created in the Baronetage of the United Kingdom on 6 June 1887 for Reginald Hanson, Lord Mayor of London between 1886 and 1887 and later Conservative Member of Parliament for the City of London. The title became extinct on the death of the fourth Baronet in 1996. Sir Francis Hanson (1868–1919), second son of the first Baronet, was a well-known London merchant and was knighted in 1908.

The Hanson Baronetcy, of Fowey in the County of Cornwall, was created in the Baronetage of the United Kingdom on 6 July 1918 for Charles Hanson, Lord Mayor of London between 1917 and 1918 and Conservative Member of Parliament for Bodmin.

Hanson baronets, of Bryanston Square (1887)
Sir Reginald Hanson, 1st Baronet (1840–1905)
Sir Gerald Stanhope Hanson, 2nd Baronet (1867–1946)
Sir Richard Leslie Reginald Hanson, 3rd Baronet (1905–1951)
Sir Anthony Leslie Oswald Hanson, 4th Baronet (1934–1996)

Hanson baronets of Fowey, Cornwall (1918)
 
Sir Charles Augustin Hanson, 1st Baronet (1846–1922)
Sir Charles Hanson, 2nd Baronet (1874–1958). Hanson was the son of Sir Charles Hanson, 1st Baronet. He was a Lord Lieutenant of the City of London in 1910 and High Sheriff of Cornwall in 1936.
Sir (Charles) John Hanson, 3rd Baronet (1919–1996)
Sir (Charles) Rupert Patrick Hanson, 4th Baronet (born 1945)

Notes

References
Kidd, Charles, Williamson, David (editors). Debrett's Peerage and Baronetage (1990 edition). New York: St Martin's Press, 1990, 

Baronetcies in the Baronetage of the United Kingdom
Extinct baronetcies in the Baronetage of the United Kingdom